Thomas Clarke Jervoise (1764 – 30 December 1809) was a British politician, MP for Yarmouth (Isle of Wight).

The son of Jervoise Clarke Jervoise , Jervoise served as High Sheriff of Hampshire 1786–87 and MP for Yarmouth 1787–90, but became a lunatic.

References
 
 

1764 births
1809 deaths
British MPs 1784–1790
High Sheriffs of Hampshire